Gervais  is a city in Marion County, Oregon, United States. The population was 2,595 at the 2020 census. It is part of the Salem Metropolitan Statistical Area.

History
The city is named for pioneer Joseph Gervais who was one of the first settlers on French Prairie.

On October 6, 1902, the business district of the city burned and losses were estimated at $100,000. The local fire department's power was insufficient to handle the fire so Portland and Salem were called upon to help. Unfortunately they were unable to respond in time to help. In little over an hour all but two of the businesses in the town had burned to the ground.

In the late 1960s, Russian Old Believers established a small colony between Gervais and Mt. Angel. As of 2002, Oregon had the highest population of Old Believers in the United States.

Geography

Demographics

2010 census
As of the census of 2010, there were 2,464 people, 579 households, and 506 families living in the city. The racial makeup of the city was 52.4% White, 0.6% African American, 3.7% Native American, 0.9% Asian, 38.0% from other races, and 4.5% from two or more races. Hispanic or Latino of any race were 67.1% of the population.

There were 579 households, of which 61.0% had children under the age of 18 living with them, 63.6% were married couples living together, 15.4% had a female householder with no husband present, 8.5% had a male householder with no wife present, and 12.6% were non-families. 7.8% of all households were made up of individuals, and 1.9% had someone living alone who was 65 years of age or older. The average household size was 4.25 and the average family size was 4.40.

The median age in the city was 26.3 years. 37.3% of residents were under the age of 18; 10.6% were between the ages of 18 and 24; 30.6% were from 25 to 44; 17.8% were from 45 to 64; and 3.7% were 65 years of age or older. The gender makeup of the city was 52.5% male and 47.5% female.

2000 census
As of the census of 2000, there were 2,009 people, 452 households, and 391 families living in the city. The population density was 5,133.7 people per square mile (1,988.9/km2). There were 477 housing units at an average density of 1,218.9 per square mile (472.2/km2). The racial makeup of the city was 40.32% White, 0.35% African American, 1.54% Native American, 0.30% Asian, 0.05% Pacific Islander, 52.91% from other races, and 4.53% from two or more races. Hispanic or Latino of any race were 65.21% of the population.

There were 452 households, out of which 59.7% had children under the age of 18 living with them, 66.8% were married couples living together, 9.7% had a female householder with no husband present, and 13.3% were non-families. 9.5% of all households were made up of individuals, and 2.7% had someone living alone who was 65 years of age or older. The average household size was 4.39 and the average family size was 4.45.

In the city, the population was spread out, with 37.7% under the age of 18, 12.9% from 18 to 24, 34.0% from 25 to 44, 10.6% from 45 to 64, and 4.7% who were 65 years of age or older. The median age was 24 years. For every 100 females, there were 120.5 males. For every 100 females age 18 and over, there were 132.1 males.

The median income for a household in the city was $43,882, and the median income for a family was $44,118. Males had a median income of $21,490 versus $21,167 for females. The per capita income for the city was $10,862. About 13.3% of families and 17.3% of the population were below the poverty line, including 20.9% of those under age 18 and 11.0% of those age 65 or over.

References

External links
 Entry for Gervais in the Oregon Blue Book

 
Cities in Oregon
Cities in Marion County, Oregon
Salem, Oregon metropolitan area
Old Believer communities in the United States
1874 establishments in Oregon
Populated places established in 1874
Russian-American culture in Oregon